Royal Concierge is the codename of a secret GCHQ programme that watches the bookings made at select hotels worldwide. The programme was introduced in 2010 and monitored 350 hotels around the world. The system alerted GCHQ to a diplomat's travel arrangements and allowed GCHQ to bug rooms in preparation for the diplomat's arrival.

External links

GCHQ operations
Secret government programs
Surveillance